Ian Symons (born 14 May 1980) is a South African former field hockey player who competed in the 2004 Summer Olympics and in the 2008 Summer Olympics.

References

External links

1980 births
Living people
South African male field hockey players
Olympic field hockey players of South Africa
Field hockey players at the 2004 Summer Olympics
Field hockey players at the 2008 Summer Olympics
Field hockey players at the 2006 Commonwealth Games
Commonwealth Games competitors for South Africa
Pembroke Wanderers Hockey Club players
Men's Irish Hockey League players
South African expatriate sportspeople in Ireland
2006 Men's Hockey World Cup players